William Henry Hewitt VC (19 June 1884 – 7 December 1966) was a South African soldier, and recipient of the Victoria Cross, the highest military award for gallantry in the face of the enemy given to British and Commonwealth forces, during the First World War.

Details
He was 33 years old, and a lance-corporal in the 2nd South African Light Infantry, South African Forces during the First World War when the following deed took place for which he was awarded the VC.

On 20 September 1917 east of Ypres, Belgium, Lance-Corporal Hewitt attacked a pill-box with his section and tried to rush the doorway. The garrison, however, proved very stubborn and in the attempt the lance-corporal received a severe wound. Nevertheless, he proceeded to the loophole of the pill-box where, in his attempts to put a bomb in it, he was again wounded in the arm. Undeterred, he finally managed to get the bomb inside where it dislodged the occupants and they were successfully dealt with by the rest of the section.

Further information
He later achieved the rank of major.

The medal
Hewitt's medal is on permanent loan to the Imperial War Museum from Framlingham College, Suffolk, England.  It was given to the school by his wife after his death.

References

Monuments to Courage (David Harvey, 1999)
The Register of the Victoria Cross (This England, 1997)
VCs of the First World War - Passchendaele 1917 (Stephen Snelling, 1998)

External links
Location of grave and VC medal (Gloucestershire)
 
 

1884 births
1966 deaths
People from Babergh District
People educated at Framlingham College
South African World War I recipients of the Victoria Cross
South African Army officers
Military personnel from Suffolk
British emigrants to South Africa